Bernard Whalen "Bert" Convy (July 23, 1933 – July 15, 1991) was an American actor, singer, game show host and panelist known for hosting Tattletales, Super Password and Win, Lose or Draw.

Early life
Convy was born in St. Louis, Missouri, the son of Bernard Fleming  and Monica (née Whalen) Convy. Convy's family moved to Los Angeles when he was 7 years old. He later attended North Hollywood High School, where he was an all-around athlete.  The Philadelphia Phillies offered him a contract when he was just 17 and he played two years of Minor League Baseball in 1951–52. He later joined the 1950s vocal band The Cheers, who had a Top-10 hit in 1955 with "Black Denim Trousers and Motorcycle Boots".

Convy attended UCLA School of Theater, Film and Television, where he received a bachelor's degree.

Career

Early years
After a two-season stint in the  Philadelphia Phillies minor league system, Convy began his career in the entertainment business as a featured performer and singer in the Billy Barnes Revues of the 1950s and 1960s. Bert portrayed a CBS usher on Art Linkletter's House Party in 1956. He appeared in the 1961 Warner Bros. drama Susan Slade, playing Troy Donahue′s rival for the affections of Connie Stevens. Convy went on to become a Broadway actor, starring as Perchik in the original cast of Fiddler on the Roof (1964), appearing in The Impossible Years (1965) and creating the role of Cliff Bradshaw in Cabaret (1966). He also appeared in the Roger Corman film A Bucket of Blood, playing Lou Raby, and in the soap opera Love of Life, playing Glenn Hamilton, a rapist. He also appeared on The Partridge Family, playing the role of politician Richard Lawrence in "A Likely Candidate", which aired on November 3, 1972.

Game shows
In the 1960s and 1970s, Convy was a popular semi-regular panelist on several game shows, including What's My Line?, To Tell the Truth, Match Game (he would later star as the host of the pilot for Match Game '90 in 1989) and Password. He soon took the podium himself as host of several game shows, including the fourth edition of Password (called Super Password) (1984–1989) and Tattletales (1974–1978, 1982–1984), for which he won a Daytime Emmy Award for  Outstanding Game Show Host in 1977. In 1979, he appeared on Password Plus with fellow celebrity contestants such as Elizabeth Montgomery, Carol Burnett, Phyllis Diller, Judy Norton Taylor, Marcia Wallace and Elaine Joyce.

Convy and Burt Reynolds formed their own production company, Burt and Bert Productions, during the 1980s. Their first production was a game show titled Win, Lose or Draw, which made its debut in 1987 as part of the NBC daytime lineup and in nightly syndication. Convy hosted the syndicated edition of Win, Lose or Draw for its first two seasons, then left the show to host another of his company's productions, the syndicated 3rd Degree.

When 3rd Degree went to pilot, Peter Marshall was brought in to be the host. When the series was picked up for syndication, however, Convy decided to leave his position as the host of the syndicated edition of Win, Lose or Draw and take Marshall's place on 3rd Degree. Marshall filed a lawsuit against Convy for the action, but later dropped it after Convy's cancer diagnosis was made public.

Around the time that 3rd Degree was cancelled, Convy was called upon by Mark Goodson Productions again to host a week's worth of pilot episodes for a revival of Match Game that Goodson was attempting to sell to ABC.

Acting
He turned to acting full-time in 1956 and was in the musical The Billy Barnes Revue in Los Angeles before moving to New York City. He appeared in 10 Broadway shows, including "Nowhere to Go but Up", Cabaret (in which he originated the role of Cliff, a fictionalized Christopher Isherwood), and The Impossible Years. He played the reporter Hildy Johnson in a 1969 Broadway revival of The Front Page, which starred Robert Ryan. In the original Broadway cast of Fiddler on the Roof with Zero Mostel, Convy played Perchik the Student and sang "Now I Have Everything". He filled in for Raul Julia in the lead role of Guido Contini in the Broadway musical Nine when Julia went on vacation.

Convy guest-starred in an episode of Perry Mason titled "The Case of the Nimble Nephew", which aired in April of 1960.  He played Harry Thompson, the defendant.  In the 1960–1961 season, Convy guest-starred on Pat O'Brien's short-lived sitcom Harrigan and Son as well as the series 77 Sunset Strip in the role of David. In 1961, he appeared in the Alfred Hitchcock Presents episode "Museum Piece." He portrayed Roxy in the pilot episode of The New Phil Silvers Show in 1963, although the role of Roxy went to Pat Renella for the remainder of the series's run. He was also cast on an episode of The Mary Tyler Moore Show as Mary's friend Jack Foster, alongside future Alice star Beth Howland. In 1973, Convy was a guest star in two episodes of Hawaii Five-O. 

In 1974, Convy portrayed Lt. Steve Ostrowski, the police officer nephew of elderly amateur sleuths on the short-lived series The Snoop Sisters.

Convy attempted a short-lived variety series called The Late Summer Early Fall Bert Convy Show in 1976. In 1979, he appeared with the Dallas Cowboys Cheerleaders in their eponymous television movie. Throughout his career, Convy was a frequent guest star on series such as Bewitched, Hawaii Five-O, The Partridge Family, Mission: Impossible, The Silent Force, The New Phil Silvers Show, Fantasy Island, Charlie's Angels and Murder, She Wrote (including the pilot episode). In 1983, Convy was cast as Neil Townsend on the sitcom It's Not Easy, playing opposite Ken Howard. Convy had joined the project when it was recast after its intended premiere in the 1982–83 season was delayed; he earned the role originally given to Larry Breeding, who was killed in a car accident in September 1982 after the first pilot had been shot.

Convy also starred in several movies, perhaps most memorably Semi-Tough (1977), in which he played a caricature of Werner Erhard named Friedrich Bismark. Other film credits included A Bucket of Blood (1959), Susan Slade (1961), Philippe de Broca's Les Caprices de Marie (1970), SST: Death Flight (1977), the horror film Jennifer (1978), Hanging by a Thread (1979), Racquet (1979), The Man in the Santa Claus Suit (1979), Hero at Large (1980), The Cannonball Run (1981), and the television movie Help Wanted: Male (1982). Convy tried his hand at directing with the comedy Weekend Warriors (1986). In 1980, Convy produced and directed the Goodspeed Musicals premiere of Zapata, with music and lyrics by Harry Nilsson and Perry Botkin Jr. and libretto by Allan Katz.

Personal life
Convy was married twice. He married Anne Anderson in 1959; together they had three children: Jennifer, Joshua, and Jonah. Convy and Anderson divorced in 1991. Convy married his second wife, Catherine Hills, five months before his death.

Death
In April 1990, Convy was admitted to Cedars-Sinai Medical Center after collapsing while visiting his mother, who had been hospitalized for a stroke. He was diagnosed with a glioblastoma, which forced him into retirement. On July 15, 1991, Convy died at his home in Brentwood, Los Angeles, eight days before his 58th birthday. He is buried at Forest Lawn Memorial Park in the Hollywood Hills of Los Angeles.

Partial filmography

 A Bucket of Blood (1959) as Lou Raby
 One Step Beyond (March 15, 1960) as Professor Andersson  (episode "The Explorer")
 Gunman's Walk (1960) as Paul Chauard
 Perry Mason (1960) as Harry Thompson (S3E21, "The Nimble Nephew")
 Susan Slade (1961) as Wells Corbett
 Act One (1961) as Archie Leach
 The New Phil Silvers Show (1963) as Roxy (S1E5, "Harry Today, Gone Tomorrow")
 Give Her the Moon (1970) as Broderick MacPower
 Death Takes a Holiday (TV movie, 1971) as John Cummings
 Keep the Faith (1972) as Rabbi Miller
 Mission: Impossible (1972) as Doug Stafford (S6E22, "Trapped")
 The Mary Tyler Moore Show (1972) as Jack Foster (S3E10, "Have I Found A Guy For You")
 Lady Luck (TV movie, 1973) as Clay
 The Girl on the Late, Late Show (TV movie, 1974) as F J Allen
 Shakespeare Loves Rembrandt (TV movie, 1974)
 The Love Boat II (TV movie, 1977) as Ralph Manning
 SST: Death Flight (TV movie, 1977) as Tim Vernon
 Semi-Tough (1977) as Friedrich Bismark
 Jennifer (1978) as Jeff Reed
 Thou Shalt Not Commit Adultery (TV movie, 1978) as Bill Dent
 Dallas Cowboys Cheerleaders (TV movie, 1979) as Lyman Spencer
 Hanging by a Thread (TV movie, 1979) as Alan Durant
 Racquet (1979) as Tommy Everett
 Charlie's Angels, Season 4 (1979)
 Ebony, Ivory and Jade (TV movie, 1979) as Mick Jade
 The Man in the Santa Claus Suit (TV movie, 1979) as Gil Travis
 Hero at Large (1980) as Walter Reeves
 The Cannonball Run (1981) as Brad
 Jacqueline Susann's Valley of the Dolls (TV mini-series, 1981) as Tony Polar
 Help Wanted: Male (TV movie, 1982) as Skip McCullough
 Love Thy Neighbor (TV movie, 1984) as Mike Wilson

See also

 List of notable brain tumor patients

References

External links

|-

1933 births
1991 deaths
Male actors from St. Louis
American game show hosts
American male film actors
American male musical theatre actors
American male soap opera actors
American male television actors
Burials at Forest Lawn Memorial Park (Hollywood Hills)
Daytime Emmy Award for Outstanding Game Show Host winners
Deaths from glioblastoma
Deaths from brain cancer in the United States
Emmy Award winners
Era Records artists
Klamath Falls Gems players
Miami Eagles players
Salina Blue Jays players
UCLA Film School alumni
20th-century American male actors
20th-century American singers
People from Brentwood, Los Angeles
20th-century American male singers
North Hollywood High School alumni